Laurence Hector Barnett (8 May 1900 – 13 June 1982) was an English footballer. He began his career with Bradford Park Avenue in 1920. After 33 League appearances for the club, he had a spell with Gainsborough Trinity. In 1924 he joined Barnsley, for whom he made 28 appearances in the League. A year later he signed for Blackpool, making 46 League appearances in his two years with the Bloomfield Road club. He finished his career with Manchester City, where he made 84 League appearances in his four years at Maine Road.

References

1900 births
1982 deaths
Association football fullbacks
Association football wing halves
English footballers
Bradford (Park Avenue) A.F.C. players
Gainsborough Trinity F.C. players
Barnsley F.C. players
Blackpool F.C. players
Manchester City F.C. players
English Football League players
Manchester City F.C. non-playing staff
FA Cup Final players